Argyrogramma verruca (golden looper) is a moth of the family Noctuidae. It is found from Maine to Florida to Texas, Kentucky, Arizona, Kansas, Southern Michigan, Pennsylvania, Ohio, Southern Ontario, the Antilles, Central America to Brazil to Northern Argentina and Paraguay.

The wingspan is about 28 mm.

External links
Images
Moths of Belize

Plusiinae
Moths of North America
Moths of South America
Moths described in 1794